Ukari Okien Figgs (born March 31, 1977) is an American former collegiate and professional women's basketball player.

High School and College years 
Born in Georgetown, Kentucky, Figgs led the Scott County girls' basketball team to a state title in 1995, and she was named Kentucky's Miss Basketball.

Figgs then went to school on a scholarship, starring on the women's basketball team at Purdue University, averaging 11.6 points and 3.3 assists in her four-year career.  In her senior season, Figgs averaged 16.3 points, 4.5 rebounds and 4.2 assists.  Purdue handily won the NCAA Championship that year (winning all of its tournament games by a margin of at least 10 points) and Figgs was named Most Outstanding Player of the 1999 NCAA Final Four.  Figgs' other accomplishments while at Purdue included making the 1999 All-Big Ten team and the 1998 and 1999 NCAA Regional All-Tournament Teams and winning the 1997 Best Defensive Player award.   Figgs graduated from Purdue in 1999 with a degree in mechanical engineering, taking full advantage of her scholarship.

Purdue statistics
Source

WNBA career 
Figgs was selected by the Los Angeles Sparks in the third round (28th overall) of the 1999 WNBA draft, and played for the Sparks for three seasons, which included a WNBA Championship in 2001.  Figgs then played one season each for the Portland Fire and Houston Comets.

Prior to the start of the 2004 season, Figgs retired from the WNBA; she had averaged 6.5 points, 3.1 assists, 2.3 rebounds, and had played in 151 games on three different teams.

Life after the WNBA 
She worked as a production engineer at Toyota Motor Manufacturing Kentucky in her hometown of Georgetown, Kentucky, and as an assistant coach with the boys' varsity basketball team at Scott County High School. Figgs was appointed as an assistant coach to Purdue University's women's basketball team on April 13, 2009.  On June 6, 2011 it was announced Figg's would become an assistant athletics director for women's basketball at the University of Kentucky.

On November 1, 2013, Figgs announced that she was leaving UK to return to Toyota in Georgetown as an engineer.  She cited the need to spend more time with her family as the reason for this move.

References

External links 
WNBA player profile

1977 births
Living people
American women's basketball coaches
American women's basketball players
Basketball players from Kentucky
Houston Comets players
Los Angeles Sparks draft picks
Los Angeles Sparks players
People from Georgetown, Kentucky
Point guards
Portland Fire players
Purdue Boilermakers women's basketball players